Lichtner Seamount is a seamount located in the Southern Ocean. The name, for German cartographer Werner Lichtner, was approved by the Advisory Committee for Undersea Features in April 2000.

References

Seamounts of the Southern Ocean